Černousy is a municipality and village in Liberec District in the Liberec Region of the Czech Republic. It has about 300 inhabitants.

Administrative parts
Villages of Boleslav and Ves are administrative parts of Černousy.

Geography
It lies in the Frýdlant Hills. The Smědá River flows through the municipality.

History
The first written mention of Černousy is from 1385.

Transport
There are two border crossings to Poland: railway border crossing Frýdlant v Čechách / Zawidów and road border crossing Černousy – Ves / Zawidów.

Černousy is the final station of the railway line Liberec–Černousy.

Sights
The most notable building is the Church of Saint Lawrence in Ves. It is a late Gothic church, which was first documented in 1346 and rebuilt in 1519.

References

External links

Villages in Liberec District